"You Are My Love" is a popular song. It was written by Jimmie Nabbie and was published in 1955.

The song was written by request by Nabbie for Joni James, for whom it was a major hit. The song was released by MGM Records as catalog number 12066. The song entered the Cash Box magazine best-selling singles chart on October 1, and reached #11, its highest position, on November 19, lasting altogether 16 weeks on the Cash Box best-seller chart. On the Billboard charts, Joni James' record first made the listing on October 22, spending 10 weeks on those charts, reaching #6 on the disk jockey chart, #18 on the best-selling records chart, and #15 on the composite top-100 chart.

References

1955 songs
Songs written by Jimmie Nabbie
MGM Records singles
1955 singles